Eugene William McCaslin, Jr. (born July 12, 1977) is an American former college and professional football player who was a linebacker in the National Football League (NFL) for a single season.  He played college football for the University of Florida.  He was drafted late in the seventh round of the 2000 NFL Draft, and played professionally for the NFL's Green Bay Packers.

Early years 

McCaslin was born in Tampa, Florida.  He attended Jesuit High School in Tampa, but later transferred to Chamberlain High School and played high school football for the Chamberlain Chiefs.

College career 

McCaslin accepted an athletic scholarship to attend the University of Florida, where he played for coach Steve Spurrier's Florida Gators football team from 1996 to 1999.  As a freshman in 1996, he was a member of the Gators team that defeated the Florida State Seminoles 52–20 in the Sugar Bowl to win the Bowl Alliance national championship.  Used mostly as a blocking back, he had two games where he rushed for 100 yards or more during the first three seasons of his college career.  Prior to his senior season in 1999, he switched to defense and became a starting linebacker.

Professional career 

The Green Bay Packers picked McCaslin in the seventh round of the 2000 NFL Draft, and he played in one regular season game for the Packers during the  season. After a season away from the NFL, he was a member of the Tampa Bay Buccaneers during the 2002 NFL season, but did not see any playing time during a regular season game.

See also 

 Florida Gators football, 1990–99
 List of Florida Gators in the NFL Draft
 List of Green Bay Packers players

References 

1977 births
Living people
Players of American football from Tampa, Florida
American football linebackers
Florida Gators football players
Green Bay Packers players
Tampa Bay Buccaneers players